Muttersprache is the ninth studio album by German recording artist Sarah Connor, released by Polydor Records on May 22, 2015. It is her first album to be primarily recorded in German. After her participation in the reality television series Sing meinen Song - Das Tauschkonzert in 2014, the German version of the series The Best Singers, Connor was encouraged to record songs in German. Muttersprache debuted on top of on the German Albums Chart, marking her second number-one album following 2005's Naughty but Nice. Muttersprache is primarily a pop and R&B album.

Promotion
Selected as the album's leading single, "Wie schön du bist" was released to radios and stores on May 1, 2015. An instant success in German-speaking Europe, it peaked at number two on the German Singles Chart. In Germany, the song became Connor's highest-charting single since 2005 number-one hit "From Zero to Hero." It was eventually certified platinum by the Bundesverband Musikindustrie (BVMI). In Austria and Switzerland, "Wie schön du bist" reached number eleven and number thirty on the national singles charts, where it became her biggest-charting single in seven years.

Critical reception

laut.de critic Sven Kabelitz rated the album two out of five stars. He found that "unfortunately, the lyrics linger on the level of late Rosenstolz, while using the same phrasing machine and the sentimentalism of Juli, Silbermond and Luxuslärm for long stretches." Kabelitz described Muttersprache as "sentimental feel-good banalities from the literary cat calendar, in which everyone and no one can find themselves."

Chart performance
Upon its release, Muttersprache debuted at number-one on the German Albums Chart. It marked Connor's ninth consecutive top ten album and second effort to reach the top position following the number-one debut of 2005's Naughty but Nice, her fourth studio album. With first week sales of more than 100,000 copies in Germany, Muttersprache was certified gold by the Bundesverband Musikindustrie (BVMI) just days after its release. It has since been certified triple platinum.

In Austria, Muttersprache debuted at number three on the Austrian Albums Chart behind both Conchita Wurst's Conchita and Andreas Gabalier's Mountain Man. It became Connor's highest-charting album since Naughty but Nice which also peaked at number three a decade earlier. In Switzerland, the album debuted at number-one on the Swiss Albums Chart, her first album to do so.

Track listing

Charts

Weekly charts

Year-end charts

Decade-end charts

Certifications and sales

Release history

References

External links
 SarahConnor.com — official site

2015 albums
Sarah Connor (singer) albums